Roxy Theatre was the final name of a theatre that operated from 1935 to 2006 at 1215 Danforth Avenue, in Toronto, Ontario, Canada's east end.  It was designed by the architectural firm Kaplan & Sprachman, which designed dozens of neighbourhood cinemas, and opened under the name Allenby Theatre.

In the 1930s the Allenby allowed neighbourhood children to enroll in the Popeye Club, where they could watch a double bill, and two episodes of the popeye cartoon serials, for ten cents.

During the 1970s, the theatre was run by Gary Topp and Jeff Silverman, reported to have introduced midnight screenings to Toronto.  It was the first theatre to play daring films, like John Waters' Pink Flamingos.  In addition to serving as a repertory cinema, the location was an early venue for the performance of punk rock.

The Roxy is known for playing cult-classic Rocky Horror Picture Show, every week, from 1976 to 1983.

In its final decades the theatre was one of the Festival chain of repertory cinemas of similar age.

The building's Art Deco facade earned it a listing as a building of heritage interest.  This designation, short of a full heritage designation, only preserved its facade.  The building stood vacant, for several years, making the work of conservators more difficult.

Following its final period as an English language repertory cinema, it reopened as the Apollo Theatre, and played Greek language films.  However, it retained hand-painted Star Wars murals.

The bulk of the building was demolished in November 2009, and an Esso gas station, convenience store, and Tim Hortons were constructed on the site. The facade of the building was restored with an Allenby Theatre marquee, including its ticket booth. A commemorative plaque was installed on the building with its designation as a heritage site, and historical photos are featured inside.

References

Former cinemas in Toronto
Theatres in Toronto
Atmospheric theatres
Demolished buildings and structures in Toronto
Buildings and structures demolished in 2009
1935 establishments in Ontario
Theatres completed in 1935
2009 disestablishments in Ontario